Kassim Ahamada (born 18 April 1992) is a Comorian footballer who plays as a right-back for French club Créteil and the Comoros national team.

Career
Born in Dzaoudzi, Mayotte, Ahamada has played for Troyes B, Évry, Beauvais, Bourges Foot and Vierzon at the fifth level of French football. In the summer of 2020 he was signed by Créteil to play with their B team at the same level, but during the season was drafted into the first team and played a number of games in Championnat National.

He made his international debut for Comoros in 2011.

References

External links

1992 births
Living people
Citizens of Comoros through descent
French sportspeople of Comorian descent
Comorian footballers
French footballers
Mayotte footballers
Association football fullbacks
Comoros international footballers
Championnat National players
Championnat National 3 players
ES Troyes AC players
Évry FC players
AS Beauvais Oise players
Bourges Foot players
Vierzon FC players
US Créteil-Lusitanos players
2021 Africa Cup of Nations players